Wiilman are an indigenous Noongar people from the Wheatbelt, Great Southern and South West regions of Western Australia. Variant spellings of the name include Wilman, Wilmen and Wheelman. Wiilman is the endonym.

Language
Their original language, also known as Wiilman, is extinct and poorly documented, but is generally believed to have been part of the Nyungar subgroup.

Country
The Wiilman originally occupied an estimated  of territory, taking in the future sites of Collie, Boddington, Pingelly, Wickepin, Narrogin, Williams, Lake Grace, Wagin, and Katanning.

The northern boundary of the Wiilmen is from around Wuraming, through Gnowing (north of Wandering) and Dattening to Pingelly. The eastern boundary included Wickepin, Dudinin and Lake Grace. In the south, the boundary of Wiilmen country included Nyabing (originally Nampup), Katanning, Woodanilling and Duranillin.

Mythology
Ethel Hassell wrote extensively on the "Wheelman tribe", her term for the Wiilman, but her manuscript was neglected until the American anthropologist Daniel Sutherland Davidson came across it while researching Australian archives in 1930. Davidson arranged for Hassell's work to be published in instalments in the journal Folklore (1934-1935).

According to Norman Tindale, much of the material ascribed to the Wiilman was gathered from their southern neighbours, the Koreng and actually reflects Koreng culture.

Alternative names
The neighbouring Koreng people referred to the Wiilman by the exonym Jaburu, meaning "northerners/north-westerners".

Some early colonial sources referred to them as "the Williams tribe".

Abbreviated forms of Wiilman have sometimes been used, including Weal, Weel.

Citations

Sources

Great Southern (Western Australia)
Noongar